"That's a Rack" is a song by American rapper Lil Uzi Vert, released on April 9, 2019. It was initially recorded for their second studio album Eternal Atake, along with "Sanguine Paradise". It was produced by Oogie Mane and Nick Mira.

Critical reception
Spin said the song "brims with manic energy", and Lil Uzi Vert "flows with an elasticity and abandon that's exciting and magnetic". XXL said the track features Uzi Vert's "typical array of boastful lyrics".

Charts

Certifications

References

2019 singles
2019 songs
Lil Uzi Vert songs
Songs written by Lil Uzi Vert